Redrock is an unincorporated community located in Grant County, New Mexico, United States.

Demographics

Climate
Redrock has a cool semi-arid climate (Köppen BSk) with hot summers and mild winters.

References

Unincorporated communities in Grant County, New Mexico
Unincorporated communities in New Mexico